Salceda de Caselas is a municipality in Galicia, Spain, in the province of Pontevedra. It is bordered to the north by the municipality of Ponteareas, to the southeast by the municipality of Salvaterra de Miño, to the southwest by the municipality of Tui, and to the northwest by O Porriño.

Francisco Estévez, father of United States actor Martin Sheen (real name Ramón Estévez), comes from the parish of Parderrubias.

Population
 Inhabitants: 8,835 (2012)
 Foreign population: 315 (2005)
 Median age: 38.7 (2005)

Parishes 
The municipality is divided into seven parishes: Entenza, Parderrubias, A Picoña, San Xurxo de Salceda, Santa María de Salceda, Santo Estevo de Budiño and San Vicente de Soutelo.

Notable people 
 Francisco Estévez (father of Martin Sheen)
 Denis Suárez

References

Municipalities in the Province of Pontevedra